Elisabeth Singleton Moss (born July 24, 1982) is an American actor, producer, and director. She is known for her work in several television dramas, earning such accolades as two Primetime Emmy Awards and two Golden Globe Awards, which led Vulture to name her the "Queen of Peak TV".

Moss began acting in the early 1990s and first gained recognition for playing Zoey Bartlet, the youngest daughter of President Josiah Bartlet, in the NBC political drama series The West Wing (1999–2006). She earned wider recognition for playing Peggy Olson, a secretary-turned-copywriter, in the AMC period drama series Mad Men (2007–2015), and subsequently won the Critics' Choice Television Award for Best Actress in a Movie/Miniseries and the Golden Globe Award for Best Actress – Miniseries or Television Film for portraying Detective Robin Griffin in the BBC miniseries Top of the Lake (2013). For producing and starring as June Osborne in the Hulu dystopian drama series The Handmaid's Tale (2017–present), Moss won the Primetime Emmy Award for Outstanding Lead Actress in a Drama Series and Outstanding Drama Series, among other accolades.

Moss has also attracted acclaim for her film performances, notably supporting roles in Girl, Interrupted (1999), Get Him to the Greek (2010), and Us (2019) and starring roles in The One I Love (2014), The Square (2017), The Invisible Man (2020) and Shirley (2020). She has also starred in three films by Alex Ross Perry, including Her Smell (2018). On stage, she has performed in the Broadway productions of David Mamet's Speed the Plow and Wendy Wasserstein's The Heidi Chronicles. For the latter, she received a nomination for the Tony Award for Best Actress in a Play. She also appeared in the West End production of Lillian Hellman's The Children's Hour.

Early life
Moss was born in Los Angeles, California, the daughter of Ronald Charles Moss, who is British, and Linda Moss (née Ekstrom), an American of part-Swedish descent. Both of Moss's parents are musicians; her mother plays jazz and blues harmonica professionally. Moss has one younger brother. She was raised a Scientologist.

Initially, Moss aspired to be a professional dancer. In her adolescence, she traveled to New York City to study ballet at the School of American Ballet, after which she studied with Suzanne Farrell at the Kennedy Center in Washington, D.C. She continued to study dance through her teenage years, but started getting acting roles as well. To manage her education and career, she began homeschooling, and graduated in 1999.

Career

1990s
Moss's first screen role was in 1990, when she appeared in the NBC miniseries Lucky/Chances. From 1992 until 1995, she appeared as Cynthia Parks in seven episodes of the TV series Picket Fences. She provided the voice of Holly DeCarlo, a main character in the TV special Frosty Returns (1992) and of Michelle in the animated film Once Upon a Forest (1993). She appeared in the television remake of the 1993 film Gypsy and played Harvey Keitel's younger daughter in the film Imaginary Crimes (1994). The following year, she appeared in the remake of the Walt Disney Pictures film Escape to Witch Mountain (1995) and played a young Ashley Judd in the TV-movie biopic Love Can Build a Bridge (1995). She also had a supporting role in the drama Separate Lives (1995) opposite Jim Belushi and Linda Hamilton, and a minor part in the black comedy The Last Supper (1995). She did more voice work, for the animated series Freakazoid! and the television film It's Spring Training, Charlie Brown! (1996).

Beginning in 1999, Moss played the recurring role of Zoey Bartlet in the White House television drama The West Wing, playing the daughter of President Josiah Bartlet (Martin Sheen) and First Lady Abbey Bartlet (Stockard Channing); she portrayed the character until the series finale in 2006. Her character became integral to the fourth season of the show; in a retrospective on the series The Atlantic noted: "Aaron Sorkin made [Moss] the centerpiece of the explosive fourth-season finale where he basically engineered the most insane cliffhanger possible. It required Zoey to be a bit of a pain with her fancy French boyfriend, but Moss always made her relatable, even when the plot required otherwise."

In 1999, she had a supporting role as a patient in a mental institution in James Mangold's Girl, Interrupted, opposite Winona Ryder and Angelina Jolie, and a minor part in the drama Anywhere but Here. The same year, she had a small role in the movie Mumford (1999), playing the daughter of a woman with a shopping addiction.

2000s
In 2002, Moss appeared in a commercial for Excedrin in which she directly addressed the audience about the medication's benefits for people who suffer from migraines. The spot proved enduringly popular and ran for several years, providing Moss with residual income as she struggled to make it as an actor.

Moss appeared in Heart of America and three other films in 2004. That year, she made the movie Virgin, for which she was nominated for a 2004 Independent Spirit Award. Moss also had a supporting part in Ron Howard's Western thriller The Missing (2003).

Moss had a supporting role in the 2005–2006 horror series Invasion, and appeared in television again on a 2007 episode of Grey's Anatomy entitled "My Favorite Mistake", and on the series Medium opposite Patricia Arquette. She also appeared in Mary Lambert's 2007 horror film The Attic, the independent drama Day Zero (2007), and the 2008 drama El camino.

In 2006, she was cast as Peggy Olson, secretary-turned-copywriter in the AMC dramatic series Mad Men. Between 2009 and the series' final season in 2015, Moss was nominated for five Emmy awards for the role for Outstanding Lead Actress in a Drama Series. In 2010, she was nominated for the Outstanding Supporting Actress Emmy. Reflecting on her casting in the series, Moss recalled: "I auditioned [for the role]. There were scripts for two pilots that everyone was talking about at the time that were really good, and Mad Men was one of them."

While a series regular on Mad Men, Moss made her Broadway debut in October 2008, playing the role of Karen in the 20th Anniversary revival of Speed-the-Plow by David Mamet. She then briefly appeared in the comedy film Did You Hear About the Morgans? (2009), playing Sarah Jessica Parker's assistant, followed by a part in the comedy Get Him to the Greek (2010) opposite Jonah Hill.

2010s
In 2011, Moss made her West End debut as Martha Dobie in Lillian Hellman's play The Children's Hour, opposite Keira Knightley. The play opened at The Comedy Theatre, London on January 22, 2011. In 2012, she was cast as Galatea Dunkel in the independent drama On the Road, based on Jack Kerouac's novel of the same name.

Moss played detective Robin Griffin in the 2013 Sundance Channel miniseries Top of the Lake, a co-production by the Sundance Channel, the UK's BBC Two and Australia's UKTV, written and directed by Oscar-winner Jane Campion. For her role, Moss received the Golden Globe Award for Best Actress – Miniseries or Television Film. In 2014, Moss starred in the independent film Listen Up Philip (2014), her first collaboration with writer-director Alex Ross Perry. She also starred in Charlie McDowell's The One I Love (2014) with Mark Duplass.

In September 2014, it was announced that Moss would star on Broadway as Heidi Holland in The Heidi Chronicles. The play opened on March 19, 2015, at The Music Box Theatre. Though the play received some positive reviews, it closed on May 3, 2015, due to low ticket sales. Moss was nominated for a Tony Award for her role. After production on Mad Men had wrapped, Moss collaborated again with Alex Ross Perry, starring in Queen of Earth (2015), a psychological thriller opposite Katherine Waterston and Patrick Fugit, in which she plays a mentally unstable woman who unravels at a vacation home in the company of her close friends. She was cast in a supporting part in the British dystopian drama High-Rise (2015), opposite Tom Hiddleston and Sienna Miller.

Moss appeared in the Chuck Wepner biopic Chuck (2016), opposite Liev Schreiber. In 2017, she appeared in Mad to Be Normal, a biopic of the Scottish psychiatrist R.D. Laing, and co-starred in the film adaptation of Anton Chekhov's play The Seagull alongside Saoirse Ronan, Annette Bening, and Corey Stoll. The second season of Top of the Lake, consisting of six episodes, premiered at the Cannes Film Festival in May 2017 which is set in Sydney, Australia. That same year, Moss began playing June Osbourne / Offred in the Hulu series The Handmaid's Tale, for which she has received critical acclaim and a Primetime Emmy Award for Lead Actress in a Drama Series.

In 2018, Moss had a lead role in a short film for the song "On the Nature of Daylight", by British composer Max Richter, from his album The Blue Notebooks.

In 2018, Moss reunited with Alex Ross Perry for Her Smell, portraying the role of a fictional rock star whose band breaks up over her self-destructive behavior, and appeared in The Old Man & the Gun, directed by David Lowery. Both films received positive reviews from critics. In 2019, Moss co-starred in Jordan Peele's psychological horror film Us alongside Lupita Nyong'o. The film is Certified Fresh on Rotten Tomatoes. Later that year, she starred in The Kitchen, alongside Melissa McCarthy and Tiffany Haddish, which follows three housewives who, after their mobster husbands are sent to prison, continue to operate their business.

2020s
In 2020, Moss starred in Shirley, opposite Michael Stuhlbarg and directed by Josephine Decker, portraying the role of author Shirley Jackson, which premiered at the Sundance Film Festival. She also had the starring role in the horror-thriller film The Invisible Man, alongside Oliver Jackson-Cohen and Storm Reid, which was released on February 28, 2020, to critical acclaim. In 2021, Moss appeared in The French Dispatch, directed by Wes Anderson, and Next Goal Wins, directed by Taika Waititi.

In 2020, Moss also launched a production company Love & Squalor Pictures. She is next set to star and produce Run Rabbit Run directed by Daina Reid.

Personal life

Moss holds both British and American citizenship.

She met Fred Armisen in October 2008, and they became engaged in January 2009, marrying on October 25, 2009, in Long Island City, New York. They separated in June 2010, and in September 2010, Moss filed for divorce, which was finalized on May 13, 2011.

Moss practices Scientology and identifies as a feminist. After a fan questioned whether her role in the Hulu series The Handmaid's Tale made her think about her involvement with the Church of Scientology, Moss defended her beliefs on Instagram, writing that the idea that Gilead in the series and Scientology "both believe that all outside sources are wrong or evil", as the fan had described, is "actually not true at all". She continued, "Religious freedom and tolerance and understanding the truth and equal rights for every race, religion and creed are extremely important to me."

Filmography

Film

Television

Theatre

Awards and nominations

Moss earned critical acclaim and numerous accolades for her performances in film and television. She received two Golden Globe Awards from four nominations, two Primetime Emmy Awards from fourteen nominations, two Critics' Choice Television Awards from five nominations, and two Screen Actors Guild Awards from fifteen nominations.

References

External links

1982 births
Living people
20th-century American actresses
21st-century American actresses
AACTA Award winners
Actresses from Los Angeles
American child actresses
American film actresses
American people of English descent
American people of Swedish descent
American television actresses
American Scientologists
Best Drama Actress Golden Globe (television) winners
Best Miniseries or Television Movie Actress Golden Globe winners
Outstanding Performance by a Lead Actress in a Drama Series Primetime Emmy Award winners